Alicante is a city and port in Spain on the Costa Blanca, the capital of the province of Alicante and of the comarca of Alacantí.

Alicante may also refer to:

Places 
 Province of Alicante, Spain 
 Alicante–Elche Airport
University of Alicante
 Alicante (DO), a wine region in Spain

Sport 
 Alicante CF, a Spanish football club

Plants 

 Alicante Bouschet, a grape variety cross of Petit Bouschet and Grenache
 Alicante Ganzin, a red French wine grape variety
 Alicante tomato, a medium-sized red variety of tomato

See also

Alicante Innovation and Territory